Ostanino is a rural locality (a village) in Pertsevskoye Rural Settlement, Gryazovetsky District, Vologda Oblast, Russia. The population was 5 as of 2002.

Geography 
Ostanino is located 7 km southeast of Gryazovets (the district's administrative centre) by road. Gryazovets is the nearest rural locality.

References 

Rural localities in Gryazovetsky District